Andreas Mand (born 14 December 1959) is a German contemporary author of novels, short stories and essays and a playwright. He is one of the representatives of the German Popular literature, and in addition a stay-at-home dad, because he wanted to be an active part of his children's lives.

Education and life
Andreas Mand was born in Duisburg, North Rhine-Westphalia, Germany as the son of a parson.After elementary school he attended the Fichte- Gymnasium Krefeld. Then he studied at the University of Osnabrück and attained the Magister degree in Media Studies. Later he lived for a while in Berlin and Duisburg. Several years he has been working as a stay at home father, and only wrote in his leisure, while his wife works outside of the home. Sometimes, the role of stay-at-home dad was difficult for him, because in Germany, this practice is less common. Mand is working and living in Minden, North Rhine-Westphalia.

Work

Novels 
 1982 Walks away. A school article (Haut ab. Ein Schulaufatz), Nemo Press, Hamburg, 
 1984 Internal unrests (Innere Unruhen), Kellner-Verlag, Hamburg, .
 1990 Grovers invention (Grovers Erfindung), List-Taschenbuchverlag, Munich, .
 1992 The dream of the Konditor (Der Traum des Konditors), Unabhängige Verlagsbuchhandlung, Berlin, .
 1993 Grover at the lake (Grover am See), 2. Aufl. MaroVerlag, Augsburg, .
 1994 Peng, Edition Solitude, Stuttgart, .
 1994 The red ship, (Das rote Schiff), MaroVerlag, Augsburg, .
 1996 Small Town heroes, (Kleinstadthelden), Ammann Verlag, Zurich, .
 1998 Cataloguing of childhood memories: The great Groverbook, (Das Große Grover Buch), Ammann Verlag, Zurich, .
 2001 Child of father (Vaterkind), Residenz-Verlag, Salzburg, .
 2004 Bad night-narrative (Schlechtenachtgeschichte), MaroVerlag, Augsburg, .
 2006 Paul and the Beatmashine (Paul und die Beatmaschine), MaroVerlag, Augsburg, .
 2015 The second Garden (Der zweite Garten), MaroVerlag, Augsburg, .

Short stories and essays 
 2009 Fairport Convention in: Rock Stories: Fifty short stories about music and their significance, Verlag Langen Müller, 
 2011 Essay in: Rumba with the Rum drunkards (Rumba mit den Rumsäufern), Frank Schäfer, Oktoberverlag Münster, 
 2011 Short stories in: Hyde Park-Memories. A music club of Osnabrück and the history (stories) (Hyde Park-Memories. Ein Osnabrücker Musikclub und seine Geschichte(n)), Harald Keller/Reiner Wolf, Oktoberverlag Münster,

Plays 
 2010 The Grover game (Das Grover Spiel) and Practice room eternity (Proberaum Ewigkeit), MaroVerlag, Augsburg, .

Compact Disc 
 Some time from 1984 to 1989 he was singer-songwriter of his own band of musicians that plays popular music andin 2007 he published a Demo Compact Disc Popmusik: A little file (Eine kleine Feile), which today can probably be attributed to the musical movement Hamburger Schule.
 Siebenkäs songs (Siebenkäs-Lieder), based on the novel Siebenkäs, by Jean Paul (Demo, 2 tapes), 1998

Awards
 1992 Literary award of Lower Rhine
 1996 Nominated for the Ingeborg Bachmann Prize
 2000 Candide Preis

See also

References

External links
 about Andreas Mand at the site of Virtual International Authority File (VIAF)
 
 Review of the Grover books at schoenerlesen.de (German)
 Andreas Mand in: NRW Literatur im Netz 

1959 births
20th-century German novelists
21st-century German novelists
German male short story writers
German short story writers
Living people
German male dramatists and playwrights
21st-century German dramatists and playwrights
German singer-songwriters
German essayists
German-language poets
20th-century German short story writers
21st-century short story writers
20th-century essayists
21st-century essayists
20th-century German male writers
21st-century German male writers
German male non-fiction writers